Spindlersfeld is a railway station in the Treptow-Köpenick district of Berlin on the Schöneweide–Spindlersfeld branch line. It is the eastern terminus of the S-Bahn line . It is located at the corner of Oberspreestraße and Ernst-Grube-Straße.

A two-track development of the station is not in sight; even if the proposed duplication of the whole line goes ahead, the terminus will still have only one track.

Description

History

In addition to the platform for the S-Bahn, there were on one side a loading ramp at the freight shed and a loading road. On the other side, there was a loading facility for VEB Müllabfuhr (the state waste-disposal company). The city of Berlin later closed the garbage loading siding. There were sidings for VEB Rewatex (a new name for the nationalised W. Spindler Company) and from the late 1980s for VEB Dampfkesselbau, later called VEB Behälterbau.
	
In 1983, DRG ripped up the southern of the two loading ramps and replaced it with four new freight tracks. In 1988, as part of rationalisation measures, interlocking “Spf” was closed and its supervision was taken over by the signal room at the station as part of an electro-mechanical system. The old semaphore signals were replaced by colour light signals. This was followed after Die Wende (the changes accompanying German reunification) by the removal of the freight facilities and the Rewatex siding. Today, apart from some fragments of the tracks in the ground, few signs of the past importance of the freight infrastructure remain.

In 2006, the platform was moved to Oberspreestraße, shortening the route for passengers transferring between the S-Bahn and trams to Köpenick or Adlershof. The old entrance to Ernst-Grube-Strasse has been maintained.

References

External links

Spindlersfeld
Railway stations in Treptow-Köpenick
Railway stations in Germany opened in 1892